New Stars FC is a Palauan association football club founded in 2012 which began competing in the Palau Soccer League, the top level league in Palau, in the Fall League 2012.

Players

2012/2013 Squad

References

Football clubs in Palau
2012 establishments in Palau